Vivalda Ndula (born Vivalda Patrícia António Branco) is a singer-songwriter, dancer and percussionist from Angola.

Life and career

Early life and education

Vivalda Ndula was born in Luanda, Angola. She is the sixth of ten siblings. Her father was a former FAPLA soldier during the Angolan Civil War period. When he returned unstable from the war, Ndula's mother worried about the children's safety ran
away from him taking the children including Vivalda Ndula. Two years later Ndula's father died when she was only 9 years old. In her late teens, she was a football player and enter to a second-division team called Footscola in Terra Nova.
She earned a scholarship from Footscola that allowed her to conclude her pre-university studies in Social Science at private school named "Cruz Linda" in Luanda.

Vivalda Ndula started her artistic career as Dancer signed by MINESSA Afro-contemporary Dance Company and last until 2004. Later on, she moved to MANESSÉMA Afro-contemporary Dance Company with whom she toured in Spain for the 7th International Festival of Traditional Music and Dance in Valencia. Also, she co-hosted the Angolan Public Television show "Estrelas ao Palco" in 2004.

While studying for a Bachelor's degree in International Affairs at UPRA University in Luanda, Ndula worked a day job as Assistant of former Japan Ambassador in Angola, Mr. Kazuhiko Koshikawa helping to pay for tuition fees of her 3 youngest brothers and sisters and also to help her widowed mother in her country – Angola, where socio-economic and politic life was very unstable. Later, Ndula relocated to the US, where she completed an Associated Degree at Houston Community College.

In 2017, Dula earned a Master's degree in Administration and Management of Cultural Industries at the Miguel de Cervantes European University in Spain.

Musical career

In 2009 Ndula created the Afro-contemporary Dance and Percussion company Karapinha Dura and began experimenting with the fusion of Angolan traditional sound and classical music.

Her first musical show was the Afro-contemporary "MUJÍTU" or "The Guest", created in 2010. The show written, produced, and directed by herself premiered in 2011 in Luanda and in Houston in 2013 during the 6th Akwaaba Dance and Drum Festival.

In 2013 Vivalda released her first solo work an EP "Insanidade Mental" (Mental Insanity). She toured the United States with  "Vivalda Ndula USA Tour 2014 – Henda Mua Ngola" to promote the album, performing in Washington, D.C., Chicago, New York City, Austin and Houston.

Throughout her career, Vivalda Ndula performed for different venues such as Angola Embassy in Washington D.C, Angola Consulate in Houston, Montreal Jazz Festival, WOBEON-world music and peace festival (Austin), Globalquerque Festival, Fethiye World Music Festival in Turkey. In 2010, Vivalda Dula and her band sung in the opening of the "Beat and Wind from Japanasia" taiko show in Luanda.

Vivalda cited as her inspiration during younger years Angolan and world influential musicians and bands as Mito Gaspar, Bonga (musician), Waldemar Bastos, Ngola Ritmos, Miriam Makeba, Angelique Kidjo, Tina Turner and Ella Fitzgerald. Mostly she sings in Portuguese and Kimbundu (Angola native language). Her musical style blends together Angolan traditional roots, jazz, rock and soul.

Discography

– DULA, 2018 (Album) 
AFRICA, 2015 (Album) 
INSANIDADE MENTAL, 2013 (EP)

COLLABORATIONS:

| 2014, single "Mázui" feat Kris Becker and Shiwei Wei and released during her concert in Houston.

| 2016, single "Je t´aime" feat Cheick Hamala Diabaté, nominated for Grammy Award.

Insanidade Mental

Track list 

Africa

Track list

Awards and nominations

References 

Angolan musicians
People from Luanda
Living people
Year of birth missing (living people)
21st-century Angolan women singers